TNA Impact! (stylized as TNA iMPACT!) is a professional wrestling video game based on the professional wrestling promotion, Total Nonstop Action Wrestling (TNA, now known as Impact Wrestling). The console versions of the game were developed by Midway Studios Los Angeles and published by Midway Games. Although the game sold 1.5 million units, financial issues at Midway Games prevented the planned development and release of a sequel. The game would be ported to Nintendo DS and PlayStation Portable handset consoles in August 2010 under the title TNA Impact!: Cross The Line, published by SouthPeak Games, who had acquired the TNA license and assets following the collapse of Midway.

Gameplay

TNA Impact! is geared towards a quick-paced, high-impact style of play, with less emphasis on submission maneuvers. It supports up to four players at once on a console, with online support—which includes tournaments—currently standing at one-on-one. Online play is, however, limited to the PlayStation 3 and Xbox 360 versions. Scans of the actual wrestlers were used for the game in place of hand-painted textures to include small details, such as skin texture and specific scars. Finishers are accessed by building up the "Impact! meter" displayed on the screen. In the same area a color-coded damage indicator shows the condition of characters. The game also features mini-games for escaping pin attempts and submission holds.

TNA's signature match, Ultimate X, is a playable match type, alongside the more standard Singles, Tag team and Fatal Four Way matches. Submission and Falls Count Anywhere matches are also included. Eight different venues—including TNA's main home; Florida's Impact! Zone, and arenas set in Japan, Mexico, England, Las Vegas, and locations designed to evoke the independent circuit feel—are available to house matches, with the Impact! Zone having an increased ringside area for play and hot spots for player interaction. Liverpool Olympia is also a playable arena in the game.

Midway has now introduced downloadable content which enables players to expand the game, making TNA Impact! the first professional wrestling video game in history to offer this service. The first downloadable content is in the form of new wrestlers players can add to the game, these being Curry Man and Petey Williams. These can be bought for 100 Microsoft points from the Xbox Live Marketplace and as an extra gift the player can download Mike Tenay free of charge. This feature is only available for Xbox 360 and started on November 6, 2008, however, the content was initially glitched and made Curry Man come out as Christopher Daniels in his entrance and Petey Williams comes out as A.J. Styles and have the model of Senshi in the ring. These glitches were later fixed.

The story mode's main character is a wrestler named Suicide. During every iMPACT! episode after the August 14, 2008 version of iMPACT!, the words "whoissuicide.com" flashed on the screen for less than a second. On the website, it shows that Suicide is being taken from the game to real life television. At the Final Resolution pay-per-view in December 2008, Suicide first appeared on TNA programming.
At Destination X 2009, Suicide competed in his debut match in TNA, which was an Ultimate X match, and became the new X Division Champion.

Development
After periods of negotiation with Electronic Arts and Rockstar Games, TNA signed a multi-year agreement with Midway Games on November 7, 2005. Midway announced their intentions to release Impact!, the first game in TNA's history, for each of the seventh generation consoles on March 2, 2006.

Several TNA wrestlers were involved in the game's production. The self described "hardcore gamers" Samoa Joe and A.J. Styles both took part in meetings with Midway staff to brainstorm gameplay ideas, and Joe, Styles, Christopher Daniels, Senshi, Sonjay Dutt, and Jeff Jarrett were all a part of the motion capture sessions. During the October 23, 2006 tapings of the weekly TNA Impact! program, members of the TNA roster were "scanned" for the game and audio samples of the Impact! Zone crowd were recorded. The Liverpool Olympia in Liverpool, England was used for reference photos, used to inspire the unlockable 'London' venue in the game.

Other features
Classic TNA highlight matches were featured in the video game as TNA Extras with two matches being filmed as Midway games exclusive matches being a Knockouts Gauntlet Match and a Six Way X Division Match.

Reception

TNA Impact! received "mixed or average" reviews, while the Wii version received "generally unfavorable" reviews, according to review aggregator Metacritic.

The game was praised for its realistic graphics and simple control scheme but criticized for its limited and repetitive movesets, poor entrances, lack of championship belts, and inconsistent AI. GameSpot wrote of the PlayStation 3 and Xbox 360 versions, "It's no heavyweight champion, but this brawler still packs a satisfying punch"; and of the PlayStation 2 version, "High-impact action and lively animation save this brawler from mediocrity."

On February 12, 2009, Midway Games announced TNA iMPACT! had shipped approximately 1.5 million units.

Mobile tie-in 
In 2008, Longtail Studios created the game TNA Wrestling for Verizon Wireless mobile devices to coincide with this release. The game would be re-released in 2009 for iOS.

In 2011, Namco Networks released TNA Wrestling Impact! for mobile devices.

Cancelled sequel
Midway Games originally announced a sequel to the game. In July 2009, Time Warner (through its subsidiary Warner Bros. Interactive Entertainment) purchased the majority of Midway. The TNA license was not included with the purchase. In a September 2009 interview, TNA president Dixie Carter announced that TNA was looking for a new video game partner. 

On November 11, 2009, SouthPeak Games confirmed that it acquired Midway Games' TNA video game license in its quarterly report. The company would publish TNA Impact!: Cross the Line for Nintendo DS and PSP, with it releasing in June 2010. The game was essentially the same as the 2008 release, with the addition of several new characters and the removal of older ones, such as Christian Cage who departed TNA in 2008.

See also

List of licensed wrestling video games

References

External links
 

2008 video games
Impact Wrestling video games
Midway video games
PlayStation 2 games
PlayStation 3 games
Unreal Engine games
Video games using Havok
Video games developed in the United States
Wii games
Xbox 360 games
Multiplayer and single-player video games